Andrzej Piotrowski (born 27 January 1958) is a Polish weightlifter. He competed in the men's middle heavyweight event at the 1988 Summer Olympics.

References

External links
 

1958 births
Living people
Polish male weightlifters
Olympic weightlifters of Poland
Weightlifters at the 1988 Summer Olympics
People from Pułtusk
20th-century Polish people